Anna Chakvetadze was the defending champion, but lost in the quarterfinals to Alona Bondarenko.

Unseeded Tamarine Tanasugarn won in the final 7–5, 6–3, against Dinara Safina.

Seeds
The top two seeds receive a bye into the second round.

Main draw

Finals

Top half

Bottom half

Qualifying draw

Seeds

  Iveta Benešová (qualified)
  Marina Erakovic (qualified)
  Marta Domachowska (qualifying competition)
  Anastasia Rodionova (first round)
  Chan Yung-jan (qualifying competition)
  Sabine Lisicki (first round)
  Tamarine Tanasugarn (qualified)
  Aleksandra Wozniak (qualifying competition)

Qualifiers

  Iveta Benešová
  Marina Erakovic
  Angelique Kerber
  Tamarine Tanasugarn

Lucky losers

  Chan Yung-jan

First qualifier

Second qualifier

Third qualifier

Fourth qualifier

External links
Draw and Qualifying draw

Women's Singles
Ordina Open

pl:Ordina Open 2008 - kobiety